The Santa Cecilia Orchestra is a symphony orchestra in Los Angeles, California. It was founded in 1993 by Sonia Marie De León de Vega, who has since then been the principal conductor. The orchestra performs chamber music and full orchestral concerts at the Thorne Hall, part of Occidental College in Eagle Rock, California. Its two-year music education program, Discovering Music, is currently offered in 16 elementary schools throughout Los Angeles.

The orchestra generally seeks to promote Latin American composers, presenting their pieces alongside works by major Western composers of classical music.

History 

Sonia Marie De León de Vega founded the orchestra in 1992 with money of her own. At the orchestra's first concert, in St. Ignatius Church in Highland Park, Los Angeles, 28 musicians performed for an audience of 12 people.

Thorne Hall at Occidental College, where De León teaches, became the permanent residence of the orchestra for the 1999-2000 season. The orchestra has 85 paid professional musicians from other orchestras, both symphonic and cinematic.

The orchestra has an annual budget of about $250,000, and has received funding from the National Endowment for the Arts, the California Arts Council, and the Cultural Affairs Department and County Arts Commission of Los Angeles.

Discovering Music program

The Discovering Music program of the orchestra was started in 1998. Orchestra members visit elementary schools in the Los Angeles area to present classical music and orchestral instruments. The program has reached more than 40 schools and tens of thousands of students.

References

Musical groups established in 1993
Musical groups from Los Angeles
Orchestras based in California